Joanna Franquelli is a Filipino former basketball player and fencer who is the head coach of the Philippines women's national handball team as of January 2017.

Sporting career

Basketball
Franquelli played for the women's basketball team of the University of Santo Tomas and was named the first woman MVP of the University Athletic Association of the Philippines (UAAP) for the 1995-96 season. She led UST to two senior titles

She was part of the Philippines women's national basketball team that won silver at the 1997 SEABA Championship under coach Ricardo Roces.

Fencing
Franquelli also competed for her country as a fencer. At the 2007 Southeast Asian Games she managed to get a bronze medal at the women's individual saber event. She also competed at the 2006 Asian Games.

Handball
Franquelli mentored the women's national handball team that participated at the 2013 Southeast Asian Women's Handball Championships, which was the team's first international competition. She is the head coach of the women's team as early as November 2012.

References

1976 births
Living people
Filipino women's basketball players
Philippines women's national basketball team players
Handball coaches of international teams
Filipino female sabre fencers
Fencers at the 2006 Asian Games
UST Tigresses basketball players
Southeast Asian Games medalists in fencing
Southeast Asian Games silver medalists for the Philippines
Southeast Asian Games bronze medalists for the Philippines
Competitors at the 2005 Southeast Asian Games
Competitors at the 2007 Southeast Asian Games
Asian Games competitors for the Philippines